Between the Fence & the Universe is an EP by recording artist Kevin Max, initially released independently in 2004 and later by Northern Records in 2005. It is a compilation of previously unreleased songs that Max initially recorded for his second album for Nashville-based ForeFront Records. However, Max and Forefront parted ways before a second record could ever be released. Max eventually moved to Los Angeles and released the songs on this EP.

Track listing

Original independent release
"Seek" – 3:38
"21st-Century Darlings" – 2:32
"Irish Hymn" – 3:43
"Stranded 72.5" – 3:43
"Golden" – 5:57
"To the Dearly Departed" – 3:59

Northern Records re-release
"Seek" – 3:38
"21st-Century Darlings" – 2:32
"Irish Hymn" – 3:43
"Stranded 72.5" – 3:43
"Golden" – 5:57
"Hallelujah" (Leonard Cohen)  – 4:53
"To the Dearly Departed" – 3:59

Personnel 
 Kevin Max – vocals, keyboards (1-5, 7), backing vocals (5)
 Erick Cole – programming (1, 7), guitars (1-5, 7), backing vocals (5)
 Jason Garner – programming (1, 7)
 Jesse Supalla – acoustic piano (3, 5)
 Doug Grean – keyboards (6), bass (6)
 Cary Barlowe – guitars (2, 3, 4)
 Andy Prickett – guitars (6)
 Tony Lucido – bass (1-5, 7)
 Jonathan Smith (a.k.a. TheRealJonSmith) – drums (1-5, 7), percussion (1-5, 7)

Production 
 Jonathan Smith (a.k.a. TheRealJonSmith) – producer (1-5, 7), recording (1-5, 7), engineer (1-5, 7), mixing (1-5, 7)
 Erick Cole – recording (1-5, 7)
 Kevin Max – recording (1-5, 7), producer (6)
 Doug Grean – producer (6), engineer (6), mixing (6)
 Skye McCaskey – assistant engineer (1-5, 7)
 Dwayne Larring – additional mixing (1-5, 7)
 Lyndon Perry – design
 Melissa Barnes – design, photography 
 Randy Spencer – management

References

External links 
NewReleaseTuesday.com Interview

Kevin Max albums
2004 EPs